Dippen is a hamlet on the east coast of the Kintyre Peninsula in Scotland. The community of Dippen is in close proximity to Dippen Bay. Roads on the east coast of Kintyre were greatly improved in the era circa 1776, when the settlement was known as Duppin.

See also
 Torrisdale Bay

Notes

References
 Taylor and Skinner. 1776. Road Map of Kintyre Road - Including Droving and Coach Notes

Villages in Kintyre